Peter Doležaj (born 5 April 1981) is a Slovak football defender who currently plays for OFK Hrušovany.

In February 2010, he was on trial in FC Vaslui.

References

External links
Peter Doležaj at Soccerway

1981 births
Living people
Sportspeople from Topoľčany
Slovak footballers
Slovakia international footballers
FC Spartak Trnava players
Slovak Super Liga players
Expatriate footballers in Greece
Olympiacos Volos F.C. players
Panetolikos F.C. players
Association football defenders
Slovakia under-21 international footballers
FK Dubnica players
AS Trenčín players
MŠK Žilina players
ŠK Svätý Jur players